Eric Demarqua Maynor (born June 11, 1987) is an American former professional basketball player and current assistant coach for the Oklahoma City Thunder of the National Basketball Association. He played college basketball for Virginia Commonwealth University. As a senior, he averaged 22.4 points, 6.2 assists, 3.6 rebounds and 1.7 steals per game in the 2008–2009 season.

Maynor was drafted by the Utah Jazz of the NBA in 2009. He has also played for the Oklahoma City Thunder, Portland Trail Blazers, Washington Wizards and Philadelphia 76ers.

Early years
Eric Demarqua Maynor was born June 11, 1987 in Raeford, North Carolina, the third of four children of George Maynor and Barbara Robinson. Maynor's father was a former collegiate basketball player at East Carolina University and was a 4th round selection of the Chicago Bulls in the 1979 NBA Draft.

High school career

Maynor began at Hoke County High School in Raeford, then transferred to Westover High School in neighboring Fayetteville for his senior year to play alongside his friend and AAU teammate De'shaune Griffin. Maynor led the team to the North Carolina state championship game, scoring 25 point in a loss to North Mecklenburg High School on March 14, 2005. For his outstanding performance during the season Maynor was named to the 2004/05 North Carolina All State Basketball team by the sports website NCPreps.com.

College career

Eric Maynor was a four-year player in the men's basketball program at Virginia Commonwealth University (VCU). He graduated from VCU with a degree in Sports Management.

Freshman season (2005–06)
Maynor played in 29 games as a Freshman at VCU, cracking the team's starting lineup by the end of the season. Maynor averaged 4.7 points and 2.2 assists in an average of 15.7 minutes per game during this first collegiate campaign.

Sophomore season (2006–07)
On March 15, 2007, Maynor scored 22 points, including the game-winning shot, in VCU's victory over Duke in the first round of the 2007 NCAA Men's Division I Basketball Tournament. Maynor's last-minute heroics are also what helped VCU to overcome George Mason in the 2007 Colonial Athletic Association (CAA) championship game.

Over the summer of 2007, Maynor was selected to represent the United States in the Pan American Games, alongside D. J. White and Michael Beasley. Maynor was only able to play two games for the American Pan-Am team, however, before he was forced from further action by a hip injury. Maynor was also named one of the 50 pre-season candidates for the men's 2007–08 John R. Wooden Award, the nation's most prestigious college basketball honor.

Junior season (2007–08)
Maynor helped VCU win the CAA regular-season title, though the team fell in the semi-finals of the conference tournament to William & Mary. He was selected as the CAA Player of the Year and selected to the All-CAA first team. The Rams failed to reach the NCAA Tournament and went on to play in the NIT, where they lost in the first round against the University of Alabama at Birmingham.

Senior season (2008–09)
During the 2008–09 season, Eric Maynor became VCU's all-time leader in assists and in made free-throws. On February 28, 2009, Maynor became the leading scorer in VCU history with a floater against Georgia State. As of March 10, 2009, he had scored a school record 1,929 points. Maynor also led VCU to a second CAA title during his career, scoring 25 points in a 71–50 victory over George Mason on March 9, 2009, at the Richmond Coliseum. The Rams went on to the 2009 NCAA Tournament but lost to UCLA when Maynor missed a buzzer-beater to win the game.

Professional career

NBA

Utah Jazz (2009)

Maynor was drafted 20th overall by the Utah Jazz in the 2009 NBA draft. He became the first VCU player ever selected in the first round of the NBA draft.

Maynor signed a two-year contract with the Jazz on July 1, 2009, and made $1.3 million in his rookie season. Although he was to back up Deron Williams, Maynor had a positive outlook on the situation. When asked in an interview with RealCollegeBasketball.com what he thought about coming off the bench in Utah, Maynor replied, "Feel real good about it... I'm getting a chance to learn from some of the best".

Oklahoma City Thunder (2009–2013)

On December 22, 2009, Maynor, along with Matt Harpring, was traded to the Oklahoma City Thunder for the rights to Peter Fehse. According to a statement made by Jazz General Manager Kevin O'Connor at the time of the deal, the trade of Maynor along with the $6.5 million contract of the injured power forward Harpring was made for financial reasons, in an effort to reduce the team's liability under the NBA's punitive "luxury tax" on teams with excessive salaries.

"Trading Eric was a difficult decision," O'Connor acknowledged, while noting that the team remained strong at the point guard position with star Deron Williams and Ronnie Price as a capable and proven reserve player.

Maynor wound up as the backup point guard on the young Thunder team behind the emerging superstar Russell Westbrook, drafted by the franchise as the #4 overall pick one year prior to Maynor coming into the NBA.

On January 7, 2012, the Thunder reported that Maynor had torn his right anterior cruciate ligament (ACL) in the fourth quarter of Oklahoma City's 98–95 win over the Houston Rockets and would miss the remainder of the season. Without Maynor the Thunder reached the 2012 NBA Finals, but lost in five games to the Miami Heat.

Portland Trail Blazers (2013)

In a deal concluded just 30 minutes before the noon trade deadline on February 21, 2013, Maynor was traded to the Portland Trail Blazers for the NBA rights to Greek player Giorgos Printezis. Maynor was averaging just 2.8 points and 2.0 assists in an average of about 10.6 minutes per game playing for the Thunder and had fallen to number three on the team's depth chart for point guards, with second-year player Reggie Jackson emerging to capture most of the team's backup PG minutes. The Blazers were forced to waive reserve point guard Ronnie Price to make room on the team's 15-man roster for Maynor.

Portland General Manager Neil Olshey was effusive about Maynor's style of play and his fit for the club, calling Maynor "a great guy to run our second unit while being able to play with our starters." Olshey noted that Maynor was known for making excellent decisions with the basketball while playing at a steady and reliable pace and offered the possibility that Maynor might potentially share time in the backcourt with Blazer rookie star Damian Lillard.

Olshey expressed hope that Maynor would mesh well with the team and make a solid long-term addition to the roster, declaring:

"You don't make moves just for 28 games, but clearly there's going to be an evaluation curve for us where we're going to have to evaluate Eric, see how he fits in with our team, our style of play, our culture.... We'll see what kind of opportunities present themselves."

Washington Wizards (2013–2014) 
On July 10, 2013, Maynor signed with the Washington Wizards.

Philadelphia 76ers (2014) 
On February 20, 2014, Maynor was traded to the Philadelphia 76ers in a three-team trade involving the Nuggets and the Wizards. On March 17, 2014, he was waived by the 76ers.

Europe
On January 14, 2015, Maynor signed a contract with Pallacanestro Varese of Italy for the rest of the 2014–15 Lega Basket Serie A season.

On July 23, 2015, he signed a one-year contract with the Russian club Nizhny Novgorod.

On July 27, 2016, Maynor returned to Pallacanestro Varese, signing a contract for the 2016–17 season.

On November 20, 2017, Maynor signed with Italian club Orlandina Basket for the rest of the 2017–18 season.

The Basketball Tournament
In 2017, Maynor participated in The Basketball Tournament for Ram Nation, a team of VCU alumni. Maynor averaged 13.5 PPG, 7.3 APG, and 5.5 RPG to help Ram Nation reach the Elite 8. In the Elite 8, Ram Nation lost a close game to the eventual tournament champs, Overseas Elite. The Basketball Tournament is an annual $2 million winner-take-all tournament broadcast on ESPN.

Coaching career
In September 2019, Maynor was named Assistant Coach of the Oklahoma City Blue.

In August 2021, Maynor was moved from the Blue staff to the Thunder as a player development coach.

NBA career statistics

Regular season

|-
| align="left" | 
| align="left" | Utah
| 26 || 2 || 14.0 || .391 || .208 || .758 || 1.5 || 3.1 || .5 || .1 || 5.2
|-
| align="left" | 
| align="left" | Oklahoma City
| 55 || 0 || 16.5 || .434 || .362 || .692 || 1.7 || 3.4 || .5 || .1 || 4.5
|-
| align="left" | 
| align="left" | Oklahoma City
| 82 || 0 || 14.6 || .402 || .385 || .729 || 1.5 || 2.9 || .4 || .1 || 4.2
|-
| align="left" | 
| align="left" | Oklahoma City
| 9 || 0 || 15.2 || .359 || .353 || 1.000 || 1.4 || 2.4 || .6 || .0 || 4.2
|-
| align="left" | 
| align="left" | Oklahoma City
| 37 || 0 || 10.6 || .313 || .326 || .810 || .5 || 2.0 || .3 || .0 || 2.8
|-
| align="left" | 
| align="left" | Portland
| 27 || 0 || 21.2 || .422 || .380 || .683 || 1.0 || 4.0 || .4 || .0 || 6.9
|-
| align="left" | 
| align="left" | Washington
| 23 || 0 || 9.3 || .292 || .320 || .667 || 1.0 || 1.7 || .2 || .0 || 2.3
|-
| align="left" | 
| align="left" | Philadelphia
| 8 || 0 || 14.0 || .379 || .333 || .500 || 1.9 || 1.5 || .5 || .3 || 3.8
|-
|-class="sortbottom"
| align="center" colspan="2" | Career
| 267 || 2 || 14.6 || .392 || .350 || .721 || 1.3 || 2.8 || .4 || .1 || 4.3

Playoffs

|-
| align="left" | 2010
| align="left" | Oklahoma City
| 6 || 0 || 12.7 || .300 || .167 || .818 || 1.5 || 1.5 || .2 || .2 || 3.7
|-
| align="left" | 2011
| align="left" | Oklahoma City
| 17 || 0 || 12.9 || .377 || .360 || .789 || 1.3 || 2.2 || .5 || .0 || 4.8
|-class="sortbottom"
| align="center" colspan="2" | Career
| 23 || 0 || 12.9 || .361 || .323 || .800 || 1.3 || 2.0 || .4 || .0 || 4.5

References

External links

 ESPN.com Profile
 FIBA.com Profile

1987 births
Living people
African-American basketball players
American expatriate basketball people in Italy
American expatriate basketball people in Russia
American men's basketball players
Basketball coaches from North Carolina
Basketball players at the 2007 Pan American Games
Basketball players from North Carolina
BC Nizhny Novgorod players
Lega Basket Serie A players
Oklahoma City Blue coaches
Oklahoma City Thunder players
Orlandina Basket players
Pallacanestro Varese players
People from Raeford, North Carolina
Philadelphia 76ers players
Point guards
Portland Trail Blazers players
Utah Jazz draft picks
Utah Jazz players
VCU Rams men's basketball players
Washington Wizards players
Pan American Games competitors for the United States
21st-century African-American sportspeople
20th-century African-American people